The 2002 Croatia Open was a tennis tournament played on outdoor clay courts at the ITC Stella Maris in Umag in Croatia and was part of the International Series of the 2002 ATP Tour. The tournament ran from July 15 through July 21, 2002.

Finals

Singles

 Carlos Moyá defeated  David Ferrer 6–2, 6–3
 It was Moyá's 3rd singles title of the year and the 10th of his career.

Doubles

 František Čermák /  Julian Knowle defeated  Albert Portas /  Fernando Vicente 6–4, 6–4
 It was Čermák's 1st title of the year and the 1st of his career. It was Knowle's 2nd title of the year and the 2nd of his career.

See also
 2002 Croatian Bol Ladies Open

References

External links
 Official website 
 ITF tournament edition details
 ATP tournament profile

Croatia Open
Croatia Open
2002 in Croatian tennis